HMS Etchingham was one of 93 ships of the  of inshore minesweepers.

Their names were all chosen from villages ending in -ham. The minesweeper was named after Etchingham in East Sussex.
In the 1960s Etchingham and her sister ship, Cardinham were in service with the Hong Kong Royal Naval Reserve, until the unit was disbanded on 31 March 1967.

References

Blackman, R.V.B. ed. Jane's Fighting Ships (1953)

 

Ham-class minesweepers
Royal Navy ship names
1957 ships